Acropyga is a genus of small formicine ants. Some species can be indirect pests. A. acutiventris, which is found from India to Australia, tends subterranean, root-feeding mealybugs of the species Xenococcus annandalei. Living, gravid females are carried in the jaws of A. acutiventris queens during their nuptial flight, to establish the symbiotic association in founding colonies. Other Acropyga species have relationships with different species of mealybugs, and it could be a trait common to the whole genus.

Description
They have antennae with 10 or 11 segments (including the scape), short palps and reduced eyes with four to 30 individual ommatidia. In some species, the eyes are completely absent.

Distribution
Acropyga is found in the Americas, southern Africa, India to Southeast Asia and Australia. A. paleartica is known only from Greece. Fossil specimens of Acropyga  have been recovered from the Burdigalian stage. Dominican amber deposits and several individuals are preserved carrying Electromyrmococcus mealybugs. These fossils represent the oldest recorded record of the symbiosis between mealybugs and Acropyga species ants. They are found in leaf litter and forage on low vegetation, and will nest in various sites, including soil, bark and rotten logs.

Species

Acropyga acutiventris Roger, 1862
Acropyga ambigua Emery, 1922
Acropyga arnoldi Santschi, 1926
Acropyga ayanganna LaPolla, 2004
Acropyga bakwele LaPolla & Fisher, 2005
Acropyga butteli Forel, 1912
Acropyga decedens (Mayr, 1887)
Acropyga donisthorpei Weber, 1944
Acropyga dubia Karavaiev, 1933
Acropyga dubitata (Wheeler & Mann, 1914)
Acropyga epedana Snelling, 1973
Acropyga exsanguis (Wheeler, 1909)
Acropyga fuhrmanni (Forel, 1914)
Acropyga gelasis LaPolla, 2004
†Acropyga glaesaria LaPolla, 2005
Acropyga goeldii Forel, 1893
Acropyga guianensis Weber, 1944
Acropyga hirsutula LaPolla, 2004
Acropyga hystrix LaPolla, 2004
Acropyga indosinensis Wheeler, 1935
Acropyga inezae Forel, 1912
Acropyga keira LaPolla, 2004
Acropyga kinomurai Terayama & Hashimoto, 1996
Acropyga lauta Mann, 1919
Acropyga major Donisthorpe, 1949
Acropyga myops Forel, 1910
Acropyga nipponensis Terayama, 1985
Acropyga oceanica Emery, 1900
Acropyga palaga LaPolla, 2004
Acropyga paleartica Menozzi, 1936
Acropyga pallida (Donisthorpe, 1938)
Acropyga panamensis Weber, 1944
Acropyga parvidens (Wheeler & Mann, 1914)
Acropyga romeo LaPolla, 2004
Acropyga rubescens Forel, 1894
Acropyga sauteri Forel, 1912
Acropyga silvestrii Emery, 1915
Acropyga smithii Forel, 1893
Acropyga stenotes LaPolla, 2004
Acropyga tricuspis LaPolla, 2004
Acropyga yaeyamensis Terayama & Hashimoto, 1996
Acropyga yushi Terayama, 2009

References

Further reading

External links

Formicinae
Ant genera
Extant Burdigalian first appearances
Taxa named by Julius Roger